Two-banded seabream is a common name for several fishes and may refer to:

Diplodus prayensis, native to ocean in the vicinity of Cape Verde
Diplodus vulgaris, widespread in the Mediterranean and eastern Atlantic